Ahmad Taha Ghani is a Pakistani actor and musician. He appeared in acclaimed television serials such as Parizaad and Jo Tu Chahey. He made his film debut with Hassan Rana's 2017 war-epic Yalghaar.

Personal life 
Coming from a family with an army background, he is the youngest of three siblings, with a brother and a sister, and in terms of education he has earned a Bachelors in Finance and Management from Australia.

Filmography 
 Yalghaar

Television

Discography

References 

Living people
Pakistani male television actors
21st-century Pakistani male actors
1990 births